Shiva is a 2012 Kannada action film starring Shiva Rajkumar directed by Om Prakash Rao and produced by K. P. Srikanth under Company films banner. The film also stars Ragini Dwivedi in the female lead role. This venture marks the 101 feature film  for the actor Shiva Rajkumar.

Plot 
In Bangalore, Rajendra is a kind-hearted jockey in Turf Club, who is accused of cheating as his horse was drugged during the race. With the help of his best friend and investigative reporter David D'Souza, he learns that Panduranga Shetty aka Shetty, Mastaan and Aadikeshava, who are corporate businessmen as well as good friends are responsible for the incident, as Rajendra refuses to lose the race for their selfishness.

Before submitting the evidence, Shetty, Aadikeshava and Mastaan barge at David's house where they kill David, along with his wife, and are buried  in a coffin with only David's daughter Julie, being the lone survivor.

Years later, Aadikeshava and Shetty became rivals due to a misunderstanding. Julie trains herself with sharpshooting and other tactics where she begins her vengeance by killing Aadikeshava's son Ajay, which makes Aadikeshava believe that Shetty has killed Ajay. Aadikeshava orders his henchmen to trace Shetty's son and kill him. Shetty's son Shiva is a carefree youngster, who falls for Julie, working in Bharti Airtel.

After many encounters, Julie accepts Shiva's love. At the cemetery, Aadikeshava's men attack Shiva after learning that he is Shetty's son, but Shiva defeats them where he is brutally stabbed by Julie and left for dead. One of Aadikeshava's henchmen learn about Julie's involvement in Ajay's murder and the rivalry between Shetty and Aadikeshava and informs it to Aadikeshava, where he and Shetty reunite and decide to track down Julie.

It is revealed that Shiva is not Shetty's son, but an informer sent by Mastaan to gather evidence to finish Shetty and Aadikeshava's empire. Shiva tells Mastaan that Shetty's real son is in Goa, where he learns that Julie is also in Goa as Shetty's son's assistant. Shetty's son learns of Julie's agenda and chases after her, but is saved by Shiva and the duo escape.

Julie apologize to Shiva (thinking that he is Shetty's son) and reveals her past. Shiva makes a paper toy and reveals himself as her childhood friend Bunty. Shiva reveals that Rajendra was also killed by the trio (Aadikeshava, Shetty and Mastaan) on the same day D'souza died and was sent to prison on false charges. In prison, Shiva saves Mustaan, who was also imprisoned on false charges by Shetty and Aadikeshava and gains his trust, in order to wipe down the trio.

Shiva and Julie sneak into Shetty's warehouse and gathers the evidence against Shetty for illegal activities. At Turf Club, Shetty and Aadikeshava meets Mastaan, who reveals his intentions to kill them. Julie meets the trio and reveals Shiva's true identity and reveals that Shiva has taken Rajendra's place as the jockey and wins the race, where he reveals his father's innocence.

The trio challenges Shiva to save Julie from getting killed. Shiva arrives at the venue and a final combat ensues where Shiva and Julie kill the trio, thus avenging their families's death.

Cast
 Shiva Rajkumar as Shiva
 Ragini Dwivedi as Julie
 Rangayana Raghu as Panduranga Shetty aka Shetty
 P. Ravishankar as Aadhikeshava
 Gurudutt as Mastaan
 Ravi Kale as Rajendra
 Shobaraj
 Suchendra Prasad as David D'Souza
 Stunt Siddu 
 Mandeep Roy as Shindhe 
 Suchithra 
 Padmaja Rao as Julie's mother
 Mico Nagaraj 
 Danny Kuttappa 
 Ramesh Bhat 
 John Kokken as Shetty's son
 Karthik Jayaram as Ajay, Aadikeshava's son
 Mallesh Gowda 
 Saurav Lokesh as Police Trainee
 K. S. Ravindranath 
 Karthik 
 Patre Nagaraj 
 Kishore
 Harish Rayappa 
 Bullet Prakash
 Suman Ranganathan as item number "Appu Appu"

Soundtrack
After audio release in different colonies in Bangalore the Kannada film 'Shiva' audio release in a grand way was held at Chitradurga in the presence of huge attendance.

At the Old Primary school ground for the 'Shiva' audio release Upendra, Dhuniya Vijay jointly released the promo of the film. Actors Yagna Shetty, Vijay Raghavendra, Pankaj, Neethu, Ajith danced for the song numbers. Gurukiran music director of the film treated the audience with songs. Duniya Vijay danced for the song of Hodi Maga Hodi Maga.... Singer cum actor Ravishanker was part of the cultural treat of three hours audio release function.

For the audio release the estimated expenditure is Rs. 2 million plus says KP Srikanth. MLA SK Basavarajan released the audio, Madhara Channa Swamiji was present with Shivarajakumar, Upendra, S Narayan, Ragini, Om Prakash Rao and others were on the dais at audio release time.

Reception

Critical response 

A critic from The Times of India scored the film at 3.5 out of 5 stars and says "justice to his role. Sathya Hegde’s cinematography is amazing, especially in the songs. Music by Gurukiran has some foot-tapping numbers". A critic from News18 India wrote "Gurukiran's three songs are peppy - the songs for Shivraj Kumar in this film remind the songs done for his younger brother Puneeth Rajakumar by music director V Harikrishna in previous films. Cinematographer Sathya Hegde has given his best". A critic from DNA wrote "Shiva is a mismatched puzzle that only hardcore Shivarajkumar fans would want to put together. The rest of you can think of alternate weekend plans". B S Srivani from Deccan Herald wrote "The story is a non-entity here. One of the ideals of Lord Shiva is non-permanence. Shivaa subscribes to this throughout — nothing remains in the mind".

Accolades

References

External links 
 

2012 films
2010s Kannada-language films
Films scored by Gurukiran
Films directed by Om Prakash Rao
Indian action films
2012 action films